The Bucksbaum Center for the Arts is part of Grinnell College, located in Grinnell, Iowa.  The center was completed in May 1999, and actually contains the old Fine Arts complex.  The center was designed by renowned architect César Pelli.

The facilities include:

 Faulconer Gallery - A  gallery space that houses the college's Permanent Collection as well as traveling exhibitions. The gallery is named for donors Vernon and Amy Faulconer.
 The Sebring-Lewis Recital Hall - A  concert hall.
 The Flanagan Studio Theatre - A  theatre (formerly the Arena Stage), named for Federal Theatre Project director and 1911 Grinnell graduate Hallie Flanagan.
 The Roberts Theatre - A traditional thrust-stage theatre that seats 450 people.
 The Wall Performance Lab - A black box theatre.
 6 fully equipped art studios, in addition to a computer lab, scene shop, dance studio, and 15 practice rooms.

External links
 Bucksbaum Web Site
 Faulconer Web Site

References 

Buildings and structures in Poweshiek County, Iowa
Performing arts centers in Iowa
Grinnell College
Infrastructure completed in 1999
Tourist attractions in Poweshiek County, Iowa
University and college arts centers in the United States
Event venues established in 1999
César Pelli buildings
Arts centers in Iowa
1999 establishments in Iowa